Benny Andersen (7 November 1929 – 16 August 2018) was a Danish poet, author, songwriter, composer and pianist. He is often remembered for his collaboration with the singer Povl Dissing; together they released an album with Andersen's poems from the collection Svantes viser. This album and Andersen's book "Svantes viser" (Svante's Songs) from 1972 were included by the Danish Ministry of Culture in the Danish Culture Canon in 2006, in the category "Popular music". Andersen's "Samlede digte" (Collected poems) have sold more than 100,000 copies in Denmark.

In Denmark, Benny Andersen was also a well-known author of children's literature and in 1971, he was awarded the Ministry of Culture's children book prize ("Kulturministeriets Børnebogspris"). In the 1980s, his books about the fantastical creature Snøvsen, became widely popular and later inspired two films in the early 90s.

Andersen became a member of the Danish Academy (Det Danske Akademi) in 1972.

His wife, the jurist Elisabeth Ehmer, reported that Benny Andersen died in the family home in Sorgenfri, north of Copenhagen, on 16 August 2018.

Selected bibliography 
Some of Benny Andersen's notable poem collections, includes:
 Den musikalske ål, 1960
 Kamera med køkkenadgang, 1962
 Nikke Nikke Nambo og andre danske børnerim og remser, 1963
 Den indre bowlerhat, 1964
 Portrætgalleri, 1966
 Det sidste øh og andre digte, 1969
 Her i reservatet, 1971
 Svantes viser, Borgen, 1972
 Personlige papirer, 1974
 Under begge øjne, 1978
 Himmelspræt (eller kunsten at komme til verden), 1979
 Tiden og storken, 1985
 H.C. Andersens land, 1985
 Chagall og skorpiondans, 1991
 Denne kommen og gåen, 1993
 Mit liv som indvandrer, 1993
 Verdensborger i Danmark, 1995
 Verden udenfor syltetøjsglasset, 1996
 Sjælen marineret, 2001
 Svantes lykkelige dag, 2003
 Spredte digte, 2005
 Den Vilde Ungdom, 2005
 Kram, 2009
 Den nøgne mand, 2010

A few of his short stories:
 Bukserne, 1963
 Et lykkeligt menneske, 1968
 Samlede noveller'', 2003

Sources
Biography from biografi.dk(in Danish).
Benny Andersen - Biography from Litteratur.dk (in Danish).
Benny Andersen - Literature prizes (in Danish).

References

External links 

The-discographer.dk, Benny Andersen's bibliography with photos

1929 births
2018 deaths
Danish male poets
Danish composers
Male composers
Danish pianists
Danish male short story writers
20th-century Danish poets
21st-century Danish poets
20th-century Danish short story writers
21st-century Danish short story writers
20th-century Danish male writers
21st-century Danish male writers
Male pianists
Musicians from Copenhagen